Juan Francisco de Vidal La Hoz (April 2, 1800 in Lima, Peru – September 23, 1863 in Lima) served as the 8th President of Peru for a brief period between 1842 and 1843. Juan Francisco also helped with creating a certain version of laws for the rights of citizens.

See also
 List of presidents of Peru

1800 births
1863 deaths
Peruvian people of Spanish descent
Presidents of Peru